Jennifer Sheila Uglow  (born 1947) is an English biographer, historian, critic and publisher. She was an editorial director of Chatto & Windus. She has written critically acclaimed biographies of Elizabeth Gaskell, William Hogarth, Thomas Bewick, and Edward Lear, and a history and joint biography of the Lunar Society, among others, and has also compiled The Macmillan Dictionary of Women's Biography.

She won the 2002 James Tait Black Memorial Prize and the 2003 Hessell-Tiltman Prize for The Lunar Men: The Friends who Made the Future 1730–1810, and her works have twice been shortlisted for the Whitbread Prize. She is a past president of the Alliance of Literary Societies and has also chaired the Council of the Royal Society of Literature.

Personal life
Uglow was brought up in Cumbria and later Dorset. She attended Cheltenham Ladies' College (1958–64) and St Anne's College, University of Oxford. After gaining a first in English, she took a BLitt. In 1971, she married Steve Uglow, professor emeritus at the University of Kent; the couple have two sons and two daughters. As of 2015, Uglow lives at Canterbury in Kent.

Career

Uglow has worked in publishing since leaving university. Until 2013 she was editorial director of the publishing company Chatto & Windus, an imprint of Random House.

She is an honorary visiting professor at the University of Warwick, vice-president of the Gaskell Society and a trustee of the Wordsworth Trust. She was formerly a member of the British Library's Advisory Group for the Humanities.

Biographies
Uglow compiled an encyclopaedia of biographies of prominent women, first published in 1982; the work is currently in its fourth edition and contains more than 2,000 biographies, though later versions have involved other editors. Uglow later wrote:

Her first full-length biographies, depicting the Victorian women writers George Eliot (1987) and Elizabeth Gaskell (1993), continue her interest in documenting women and reflect her literary background. Gaskell scholar Angus Easson describes Elizabeth Gaskell: A Habit of Stories as "the best current biography" of the author, and The Cambridge Companion to Elizabeth Gaskell refers to it as "authoritative".

Subsequent works have moved further into the past, with subjects including 18th century author Henry Fielding (1995), and artists William Hogarth (1997) and Thomas Bewick (2006). The scientists and engineers of the Lunar Society, including Erasmus Darwin, Matthew Boulton, James Watt, Joseph Priestley and Josiah Wedgwood, are the subject of her prize-winning work The Lunar Men (2003).

Uglow's biographies have been particularly praised for their vivid, detailed recreation of the time and place in which their subjects lived. "No one gives us the feel of past life as she does" writes A. S. Byatt of Nature's Engraver: A Life of Thomas Bewick, and a review of The Lunar Men in The Observer claims "never has the eighteenth century come so much to life." Reviewing Hogarth: A Life and a World, Peter Ackroyd wrote, "She depicts the city at first hand, almost as if she herself had been wandering through Hogarth's engravings." Frances Spalding considers Nature's Engraver to be "immeasurably enriched by Uglow's canny grasp of period detail." David Chandler, however, complains that "Uglow tends to amass detail on quotable detail, when sometimes one would like a little more taut synthesis, more interrogation of those details."

Uglow's depiction of scientific thought has also been praised; A. S. Byatt, for example, describes The Lunar Men as "full of [...] the real sense that scientific curiosity is as exciting as any 'artistic' pursuit." Her discussion of art has gained a more mixed reception. The New York Times art critic Michael Kimmelman complains that Uglow overvalues Hogarth's paintings and neglects his artistic associates in favour of his literary ones. On the other hand, Helen Macdonald, reviewing Nature's Engraver, considers that it is "in her descriptions of the physical process of artistic creation, and her musings on individual engravings, that Uglow is at her most energetic and fluid."

Other writing and editing
Uglow's non-biographical writing includes a history of gardening in Britain, written for the bicentenary of the Royal Horticultural Society in 2004, which Uglow describes as a "labour of love". She is also a reviewer for The Times Literary Supplement, The Sunday Times, The Guardian, The New York Review of Books and The Independent on Sunday.

Uglow has edited collections of writings by Walter Pater (1973) and Angela Carter (1997), as well as co-editing a set of essays about Charles Babbage (1997). She has also written introductions to several works by Elizabeth Gaskell.

Radio, television and film
Uglow presented The Poet of Albion, a BBC Radio 4 programme on William Blake, part of a series marking the 250th anniversary of the poet's birth; the programme emphasised Blake's radicalism. She has also twice appeared on the Radio 4 discussion programme, In Our Time. She acted as a historical consultant on several period dramas for the BBC, including Wives and Daughters (1999), Daniel Deronda (2002), He Knew He Was Right (2004), North and South (2004), Bleak House (2005) and Cranford (2007), as well as for the films Pride and Prejudice (2005) and Miss Potter (2006).

Awards and honours
The Lunar Men: The Friends Who Made the Future 1730–1810 won the James Tait Black Memorial Prize for biography (2002), and the Hessell-Tiltman Prize for history of the International PEN (2003). Her biographies Elizabeth Gaskell: A Habit of Stories and Hogarth: A Life and a World were both shortlisted for the Whitbread Prize for biography, and several of her books have reached the shortlist or longlist of the Samuel Johnson Prize for Non-fiction. According to the charity Booktrust, Nature's Engraver: A Life of Thomas Bewick was the nonfiction work most often selected as "book of the year" by critics in 2006. In These Times, her study of the home front during the Napoleonic Wars, was shortlisted for the Duff Cooper Prize in 2014.

Uglow is a fellow of the Royal Society of Literature. She is a past chair of its Council, and as of 2017, serves as one of its vice-presidents. She was awarded the society's Benson Medal in 2012. She has been awarded honorary degrees by the University of Birmingham, University of Kent, Staffordshire University and Birmingham City University. In 2008, she was awarded the OBE for services to literature and publishing. In 2010, she succeeded Aeronwy Thomas as president of the Alliance of Literary Societies.

For Mr Lear, Uglow was awarded with the Hawthornden Prize in 2018.

Works

Biographies and studies
George Eliot, Little, Brown Book Group Limited, 1987,  
Elizabeth Gaskell: A Habit of Stories, Faber & Faber, 1993,  
Henry Fielding Northcote House Publishers, Limited, 1995,  
Hogarth: A Life and a World, Farrar, Straus, and Giroux, 1997,  
Dr Johnson, His Club and Other Friends, National Portrait Gallery, 1998, 

Palgrave Macmillan Dictionary of Women's Biography (later editions with Maggy Hendry; 4th edn; 2005)
; University of Chicago Press, 2009,  
Words and Pictures: Writers, Artists and a Peculiarly British Tradition, Faber, 2008; Faber & Faber, 2011,  

; Macmillan, 2013, 
In These Times: Living in Britain Through Napoleon's Wars, 1793–1815, Farrar, Straus and Giroux, 2015, 978-0-374-28090-1
Mr. Lear: A Life of Art and Nonsense. London: Faber & Faber, Limited, 2017. First U.S. edition: New York: Farrar, Straus & Giroux, 2018. .
Sybil & Cyril: Cutting Through Time. New York: Farrar, Straus and Giroux, 2022. ISBN 9780374272128.

Other nonfiction
; Random House, 2012, ;

As editor
Walter Pater: Essays on Literature and Art (1973)
Shaking a Leg: Collected Writings (by Angela Carter) Chatto & Windus, 1997,  
The Vintage Book of Ghosts (1997)
Cultural Babbage: Technology, Time and Invention (with Francis Spufford; 1997)

Articles

Jenny Uglow, "Stepping Out of Byron's Shadow" (review of Miranda Seymour, In Byron's Wake: The Turbulent Lives of Byron's Wife and Daughter: Annabella Milbanke and Ada Lovelace, Pegasus, 2018, 547 pp.; and Christopher Hollings, Ursula Martin, and Adrian Rice, Ada Lovelace: The Making of a Computer Scientist, Bodleian Library, 2018, 114 pp.), The New York Review of Books, vol. LXV, no. 18 (22 November 2018), pp. 30–32.

See also
Literature

References

External links
Jenny Uglow website

1947 births
Alumni of St Anne's College, Oxford
British women biographers
English biographers
English women writers
Fellows of the Royal Society of Literature
James Tait Black Memorial Prize recipients
Living people
Officers of the Order of the British Empire
Women biographers